Twenty Five Live includes 16 of Colin James' biggest fan favorites, recorded live over a sold-out three-night stand at the Commodore Ballroom in Vancouver, British Columbia, in November 2012.

Track listing 
 "Saviour" – 4:09
 "Sweets Gone Sour" – 4:26
 "I'm Diggin'" – 4:06
 "Fool for You" – 3:45
 "Sneakin' Sally Through the Alley" – 3:56
 "Shed a Little Light" - 4:15
 "Man's Gotta be a Stone" – 4:44
 "Freedom" – 5:08
 "Why'd You Lie" – 5:27
 "Oh Well" – 3:56
 "It Ain't Over Yet'" – 4:11
 "Bad Habits" – 4:47
 "Stones in My Passway / Just Came Back" – 6:27
 "Into the Mystic" - 4:31
 "Johnny Coolman" - 3:32
 "Ain't Nothing You Can Do" - 6:09

Personnel 
 Colin James - guitars, vocals, harmonica
 Chris Caddell - guitar and backing vocals
 Simon Kendall - piano, Wurlitzer, clavinet, Hammond organ
 Maury Lafoy - bass and backing vocals
 Steve Hilliam - saxes, acoustic guitar, percussion, backing vocals
 Jerry Cook - saxes, percussion, backing vocals
 Al Webster - drums

References

2013 live albums
Colin James albums